The 2006–07 daytime network television schedule for the five major English-language commercial broadcast networks in the United States in operation during that television season covers the weekday daytime hours from September 2006 to August 2007. The schedule is followed by a list per network of returning series, new series, and series canceled after the 2005–06 season.

Affiliates fill time periods not occupied by network programs with local or syndicated programming. PBS – which offers daytime programming through a children's program block, PBS Kids – is not included, as its member television stations have local flexibility over most of their schedules and broadcast times for network shows may vary. Fox does not offer daytime network programming nor network news on weekdays; as such, schedules are only included for Saturdays and Sundays. Also not included are MyNetworkTV (as the programming service also does not offer daytime programs of any kind), and Ion Television (as its schedule is composed mainly of syndicated reruns).

Legend

 New series are highlighted in bold.

Schedule
 All times correspond to U.S. Eastern and Pacific Time scheduling (except for some live sports or events). Except where affiliates slot certain programs outside their network-dictated timeslots, subtract one hour for Central, Mountain, Alaska, and Hawaii-Aleutian times.
 Local schedules may differ, as affiliates have the option to pre-empt or delay network programs. Such scheduling may be limited to preemptions caused by local or national breaking news or weather coverage (which may force stations to tape delay certain programs in overnight timeslots or defer them to a co-operated or other contracted station in their regular timeslot) and any major sports events scheduled to air in a weekday timeslot (mainly during major holidays). Stations may air shows at other times at their preference.

Monday-Friday

NBC note: Passions aired its final episode on NBC on September 7, 2007; it moved to  The 101 Network beginning with the September 17 episode. The following Monday, the network returned the 2 pm timeslot to its affiliates. In exchange, NBC took back the 10:00 am timeslot from its affiliates, as Today expanded to four hours that same day.

Saturday

Sunday

By network

ABC

Returning series:
ABC Kids
The Emperor's New School
Power Rangers Mystic Force
The Suite Life of Zack and Cody
That's So Raven
ABC World News Tonight with Charles Gibson
All My Children
ESPN on ABC (renamed from ABC Sports)
College Football on ABC
NBA Access with Ahmad Rashad
General Hospital
Good Morning America
One Life to Live
This Week with George Stephanopoulos
The View

New series:
ABC Kids
Hannah Montana
Power Rangers Operation Overdrive
The Replacements

Not returning from 2005–06:
ABC Kids
The Buzz on Maggie
Kim Possible
Lilo & Stitch: The Series
Phil of the Future
Power Rangers S.P.D.
The Proud Family
NBA Inside Stuff

CBS

Returning series:
As the World Turns
The Bold and the Beautiful
The Early Show
CBS Evening News with Katie Couric
CBS News Sunday Morning
Face the Nation
Guiding Light
The Price Is Right
The Saturday Early Show
The Young and the Restless

New series:
KOL Secret Slumber Party
Cake
Dance Revolution
Horseland
Madeline
Sabrina: The Animated Series
Trollz

Not returning from 2005–06:
Nick Jr. on CBS (continues on Nickelodeon)
The Backyardigans
Blue's Clues
Dora the Explorer
Go, Diego, Go!
LazyTown
Little Bill

NBC

Returning series:
Days of Our Lives
Meet the Press
NBC Nightly News with Brian Williams
Passions
Today

New series:
Qubo (shared with I and Telemundo)
3-2-1 Penguins!
Babar
Dragon
Jacob Two-Two
Jane and the Dragon
VeggieTales

Not returning from 2005–06:
Discovery Kids on NBC (continues on Discovery Kids)
Darcy's Wild Life
Endurance
Flight 29 Down
Kenny the Shark
Time Warp Trio
Trading Spaces: Boys vs. Girls
Tutenstein

Fox

Returning series:
4Kids TV
Bratz
G.I. Joe: Sigma 6
Kirby: Right Back at Ya!
Sonic X
Teenage Mutant Ninja Turtles
Winx Club
Yu-Gi-Oh! GX
Fox News Sunday
Fox Sports
Fox NFL
Fox NFL Sunday
This Week in Baseball

New series:
4Kids TV
Chaotic
Di-Gata Defenders
Viva Piñata
Yu-Gi-Oh! Capsule Monsters

Not returning from 2005–06:
4Kids TV
The Cramp Twins
Magical DoReMi
Mew Mew Power
One Piece
Ultimate Muscle: The Kinnikuman Legacy
Fox Sports
NFL Under the Helmet

The CW

Returning series:
All of Us 
Everybody Hates Chris 
Girlfriends 
Reba 
What I Like About You 
Kids WB! (The WB)
The Batman
Johnny Test
Loonatics Unleashed
Spider Riders
Xiaolin Showdown

New series:
The Game 
Kids' WB 
Krypto the Superdog
Legion of Super Heroes
Monster Allergy
Shaggy & Scooby-Doo Get a Clue!
Tom and Jerry Tales

Not returning from 2005–06:
 Kids WB! (The WB)
 Coconut Fred's Fruit Salad Island
 MegaMan: NT Warrior
 Pokémon (moved to Cartoon Network)
 Transformers: Cybertron
 Viewtiful Joe
 Yu-Gi-Oh! 
8 Simple Rules 
Charmed 
ER 
Pepper Dennis 
Smallville 
Supernatural 
Twins

Renewals and Cancellations

Cancellations

NBC
 Passions - It was announce that the show will moved to The 101 Network on September 10, 2007.

See also
2006–07 United States network television schedule (prime-time)
2006–07 United States network television schedule (late night)

United States weekday network television schedules
2006 in American television
2007 in American television